Malaya Cup was a tournament held annually by a Malaya Cup committee.

This is the fourth season of Malaya Cup (later known as Malaysia Cup). It were contested by states in Malaya. The final were contested by the southern and northern champions in their respective conference round. Six states sent their teams. The final were held at Selangor Club Field on 23 August 1924 where Singapore avenged their defeat against Selangor in a rematch of 1922 final's with a sole goal by Rogers.

Conference Round
Six teams participated the third edition of the Malaya Cup, Malacca, Negeri Sembilan, Singapore, Penang, Selangor and Perak. Johor were unable to raise a team. The teams were divided into two conference, the Northern Section and Southern Section. The Northern Section consists of Penang, Selangor and Perak while Southern Section represented by Johor, Negeri Sembilan, Malacca and Singapore.  Each team will play with each other (two games per team) and the winners of each conference will play in the final. Each win will give the team 2 points while losing will give 0 points. A draw means a point were shared between two teams.

Northern Section

*missing goals for July 19 match.

Southern Section

**Both teams share second place.

Final
The final were held at Selangor Club Field on 23 August 1924 where Singapore avenged their defeat against Selangor in a rematch of 1922 final's with a sole goal by Rogers. It was Singapore second successive title in four consecutive final appearances.

Winners

References

External links
1924 Malaya Cup Results by Rec.Sport.Soccer Statistics Foundation(RSSSF)

1924 in Malayan football
Malaysia Cup seasons